Visions of Eight is a 1973 American documentary film offering a stylized look at the 1972 Summer Olympics. Produced by Stan Margulies and executive produced by David L. Wolper, it was directed by eight directors. It was screened out-of-competition at the 1973 Cannes Film Festival. It was later shown as part of the Cannes Classics section of the 2013 Cannes Film Festival. Some visuals of the Munich stadium from the documentary were used in Without Limits.

Production
Wolper asked eight directors to select their own crews and create a segment which would capture some aspect of the Munich Games.
Yuri Ozerov directed The Beginning
Mai Zetterling directed The Strongest
Arthur Penn directed The Highest
Michael Pfleghar directed The Women
Kon Ichikawa directed The Fastest
Miloš Forman directed The Decathlon
Claude Lelouch directed The Losers
John Schlesinger directed The Longest
Alan Hume shot the segment The Fastest for director Kon Ichikawa. Arthur Wooster shot The Longest for director John Schlesinger, and Walter Lassally directed the photography for Arthur Penn's segment The Highest.

Reception
Visions of Eight won the best documentary award at the Golden Globe Awards, held in 1974 for films which were released in 1973.

Peter Rainer of Bloomberg News wrote that, "Schlesinger’s is the only segment that fully acknowledges the Black September terrorist attacks, in which 11 Israeli athletes and coaches, and a West German policeman, were murdered."

Rainer continues, "Penn’s entry begins daringly. Not only is the imagery a slo-mo crawl, it’s also out of focus and the soundtrack is silent. Gradually the visuals sharpen, the stadium sounds come up, but, for the most part, the pole vaulters rising into the sky remain superslow abstractions. Along with his great editor Dede Allen, who cut Bonnie and Clyde, Penn anatomizes the action without ever losing sight of the fact that these athletes, including USA’s Bob Seagren, are men and not gods (as Riefenstahl might have us believe)" — referring to Leni Riefenstahl's 1938 documentary Olympia.

Rainer sees French director Claude Lelouch's segment as a welcome contrast to the other directors' worshipful heroic depictions: "Lelouch’s The Losers ... shows us a boxer who rants in the ring after his defeat; wrestlers gamely trying to fight after tearing ligaments and dislocating limbs; swimmers treading befuddled in the pool after their last losing lap."

Availability
It is available at the Criterion Collection as part of the 100 Years of Olympic Films box set. It became available as a standalone release on June 22, 2021.

References

External links

Visions of Eight: Time and Motion an essay by Sam Lipsyte at the Criterion Collection

1973 films
1973 documentary films
American anthology films
American sports documentary films
Documentary films about the Olympics
Films about the 1972 Summer Olympics
Films directed by Miloš Forman
Films directed by Claude Lelouch
Films directed by Yuri Ozerov
Films directed by Mai Zetterling
Films directed by Kon Ichikawa
Films directed by John Schlesinger
Films directed by Arthur Penn
Films directed by Michael Pfleghar
Films scored by Henry Mancini
Films set in Munich
Films shot in Germany
Munich massacre
The Wolper Organization films
1970s English-language films
1970s American films